Huangze Temple is a Buddhist temple west of Guangyuan, along the banks of the Jialing River and at the foot of Wulong Mountain. It is the only temple that is dedicated to Wu Zetian. Huangze Temple also has  6 caves, 41 niches, 1203 sculptures all on a cliff, which were created from the Northern Wei period to the Ming and Qing.

The temple was designated as a Major National Historical and Cultural Site in 1961 and an AAAA-level tourist attraction.

References
皇泽寺
皇泽寺简介，广元皇泽寺，皇泽寺门票，皇泽寺交通，皇泽寺旅游线路－四川皇泽寺旅游
四川广元的皇泽寺，是中国唯一的女皇帝武则天的祀庙！

Guangyuan
Buddhist temples in Sichuan
Wu Zetian
Northern Wei
Ming dynasty
Qing dynasty